Wayne Niedecken Jr. (born February 10, 1957 in Pensacola, Florida), better known as Junior Niedecken, is an American stock car racing driver. Son of NASCAR driver Wayne Niedecken Sr., he is a long-term competitor in late model stock car competition in the southeastern United States.

Career
Niedecken has competed in NASCAR races and is a three-time champion of the Grand American Stock Car series, winning the series' national championship back to back in 1980 and 1981. He competed in the Busch Series for Sims Brothers Racing in four races during the 1984 season, posting a best finish of ninth at Darlington Raceway. He finished twelfth in All Pro Super Series standings in 1988, and has competed in the Snowball Derby twenty-eight times, with a best finish in the event of second in 1990.

Motorsports career results

NASCAR
(key) (Bold – Pole position awarded by qualifying time. Italics – Pole position earned by points standings or practice time. * – Most laps led.)

Busch Series

References

External links

Living people
1957 births
Sportspeople from Pensacola, Florida
Racing drivers from Florida
NASCAR drivers
ARCA Menards Series drivers